Acraga umbrifera is a moth in the family Dalceridae. It was described by Schaus in 1905. It is found in French Guiana. The habitat consists of tropical moist forests.

The length of the forewings is 11–12 mm. The forewings are white with a broad light brown postmedian shade. The inner margin is shaded and there is an indistinct discal spot. The hindwings are white with pale brown at the anal angle. Adults are on wing in March and June.

References

Moths described in 1905
Dalceridae